Daniel Suárez (born 1992) is a Mexican-born racing driver who competes in NASCAR competition.

Daniel Suarez may also refer to:

 Daniel Suarez (author) (born 1964), IT consultant and author
 Daniel Alberto Néculman Suárez (born 1985), Argentine footballer